Hosh al-Nufour or Hawsh al-Nufour (Arabic: حوش النفور) is a Syrian village in the Qatana District of the Rif Dimashq Governorate. According to the Syria Central Bureau of Statistics (CBS), Hosh al-Nufour had a population of 363 in the 2004 census.

References

External links

Populated places in Qatana District